The 2001–02 Algerian Championnat National was the 40th season of the Algerian Championnat National since its establishment in 1962. A total of 16 teams contested the league, with CR Belouizdad as the defending champions, The Championnat started on August 30, 2001. and ended on July 1, 2002.

Team summaries

Promotion and relegation 
Teams promoted from Algerian Division 2 2001-2002 
 NA Hussein Dey
 ASO Chlef

Teams relegated to Algerian Division 2 2002-2003
 MC Alger
 AS Aïn M'lila

League table

Result table

Season statistics

Top scorers

References

External links
2001–02 Algerian Championnat National

Algerian Championnat National
Championnat National
Algerian Ligue Professionnelle 1 seasons